Hisonotus heterogaster is a species of catfish in the family Loricariidae. It is a freshwater fish native to South America, where it occurs in the Jacuí River basin and the Lagoa dos Patos system in Brazil. It reaches 4.3 cm (1.7 inches) SL.

Hisonotus heterogaster was described in 2011 by Tiago P. Carvalho (of the Pontifical Xavierian University) and Roberto E. Reis (of the Pontifical Catholic University of Rio Grande do Sul) as part of a taxonomic review of Hisonotus species in the Lagoa dos Patos system, alongside five other species: H. notopagos, H. brunneus, H. vireo, H. carreiro, and H. prata. The type locality of H. heterogaster is stated to be a stream known as the Arroio Felício near the road between Júlio de Castilhos and Nova Palma.

References 

Otothyrinae
Fish described in 2011
Fish of South America